Santa Lucía is a city in the province of Corrientes, Argentina. It lies on the western shore of the Santa Lucía River, between this river and the nearby Paraná, about 20 km northeast from the city of Goya and 170 km south from the provincial capital Corrientes.

The city hosts a National Horticulture Festival every year during the first half of November.

Indigenous languages
The following language names are reported by Čestmír Loukotka (1968) as extinct unclassified languages of the Santa Lucía Mission.
Casota language
Culaycha language
Emischata language
Supeselb language
Taguaylen language

References

 
 Municipality of Santa Lucía — Portal of the city.

Populated places in Corrientes Province
Paraná River
Cities in Argentina
Argentina
Corrientes Province